Vasileios "Vasilis" Kournetas (born ) is a retired Greek volleyball player. A long-standing member of Greece men's national volleyball team, he played in more than 270 games with the Greek team and he competed at the 2004 Summer Olympics in Athens, finishing at the fifth place. He played in Greece for Olympiacos Piraeus, PAOK, E.A. Patras, Foinikas Syros V.C. and Filia Ilioupolis as well as in Russia for Lokomotiv Belgorod. He announced his retirement from volleyball courts on 5 May 2016. As a key member of Olympiacos for 14 years (1996–2009, 2013–2014) he won 1 CEV Cup, 7 Greek Championships, 6 Greek Cups, 1 Greek Super Cup and reached the final of the 2001–02 CEV Champions League with the Reds. He also won the 2012 Greek League Cup with Foinikas Syros as well as 2 Greek Championships and 1 Greek Cup with PAOK in the two final seasons of his professional career (2014-2016).

Sporting achievements

Olympic Games
 5th place Athens 2004, with  Greece National Team

CEV Champions League
  2001/2002, with Olympiacos

CEV Cup
  1996/1997, with Olympiacos
  1997/1998, with Olympiacos
  2004/2005, with Olympiacos

National Championships/Cups

 1996/1997  Greek Cup, with Olympiacos
 1997/1998  Greek Championship, with Olympiacos
 1997/1998  Greek Cup, with Olympiacos
 1998/1999  Greek Championship, with Olympiacos
 1998/1999  Greek Cup, with Olympiacos
 1999/2000  Greek Championship, with Olympiacos
 1999/2000  Greek Super Cup, with Olympiacos
 2000/2001  Greek Championship, with Olympiacos
 2000/2001  Greek Cup, with Olympiacos
 2002/2003  Greek Championship, with Olympiacos
 2008/2009  Greek Championship, with Olympiacos
 2008/2009  Greek Cup, with Olympiacos
 2009/2010  Russian Volleyball Super League, with Lokomotiv Belgorod
 2011/2012  Greek League Cup, with Foinikas Syros V.C.
 2013/2014  Greek Championship, with Olympiacos
 2013/2014  Greek Cup, with Olympiacos
 2014/2015  Greek Championship, with PAOK
 2014/2015  Greek Cup, with PAOK
 2015/2016  Greek Championship, with PAOK

Individual
 1999 Greek Cup - Most Valuable Player
 2015 Greek Cup - Most Valuable Player

Clubs
  Filia Ilioupolis (1988-1996)
  Olympiacos (1996-2009)
  Lokomotiv Belgorod (2009-2010)
  E.A. Patras (2010-2011)
  Foinikas Syros V.C. (2011-2013)
  Olympiacos (2013-2014)
  PAOK (2014-2016)

See also
 Greece at the 2004 Summer Olympics

References

External links
 profile, club career, info at greekvolley.gr (in Greek) 
 profile at fivb.org

1976 births
Living people
Greek men's volleyball players
Volleyball players from Athens
Volleyball players at the 2004 Summer Olympics
Olympic volleyball players of Greece
Olympiacos S.C. players
PAOK V.C. players
E.A. Patras players